Josh Lord (born 17 January 2001) is a New Zealand rugby union player who plays for  in the Mitre 10 Cup. His playing position is lock. He was named in the Chiefs wider training squad for the 2020 Super Rugby season, and into the full squad for 2021.

Lord was called up to the All Blacks, New Zealand's national team, for the 2021 end-of-year tests, as cover for Scott Barrett, despite having only one season at Super Rugby. He made his international debut for New Zealand, playing 22 minutes off the bench against the USA Eagles on 24 October.

Reference list

External links

 

2001 births
New Zealand rugby union players
Living people
Rugby union locks
Taranaki rugby union players
Chiefs (rugby union) players
New Zealand international rugby union players